Idekel Alberto Domínguez Rodríguez (born 2 June 2000) is a Mexican professional footballer who plays as a right-back for Liga MX club Atlas.

Career statistics

Club

References

External links
 
 

Living people
2000 births
Mexican footballers
Association football defenders
Club Universidad Nacional footballers
Liga MX players
Liga Premier de México players
Tercera División de México players